"La Ola Walzer" (Trans: The Wave Waltzer) is a song performed and recorded by Austrian artist DJ Ötzi. The song was released alongside the single "Servus die Wadln" on 31 January 2005. The single is a catchy form of 'pop waltz' song, featuring the main melody of "The Blue Danube". The song became popular following DJ Otzi's performance alongside André Rieu and the Johann Strauss Orchestra in Vienna in 2006 and in Maastricht in 2010. Since the performance there has been a small demand for an English version of the song to be released, especially in the UK.

Track listing
 "La Ola Walzer" (single mix) – 3:16
 "La Ola Walzer" (Donau mix) – 3:30
 "La Ola Walzer" (karaoke version) – 3:16

Charts

Release history

References

External links
 DJ Otzi and André Rieu - La Ola Walzer

DJ Ötzi songs
2005 singles
2005 songs
Polydor Records singles
Universal Music Group singles